Humberto de la Cruz Núñez Cubillas (born 3 May 1945) was a former Paraguayan football goalkeeper and manager.

Football career
Nene Núñez came to Spain through the Hércules CF. He kept goal for Hércules for ten years, one of them loan to CD Málaga. He helped Hércules win two promotions from the Third Division to Second and Second to the First Division.

Núñez spent one season on loan at CD Málaga, where he was well known for his towering size and punched clearances.

After his retirement as a player, he became the "house coach". He was placed on the lower grades, director of football, the second first-team coach, and was mainly devoted to training of first-team goalkeepers. On several occasions he was caretaker manager first team.

Humberto died after a heart attack in his sleep while he was napping in his hotel room where the Hércules was preparing the pre-season in July 2004. In Alicante, he was considered a very dear person, having worked for the Hércules for 35 years and died while serving the club.

References

External links
 

1945 births
2004 deaths
Sportspeople from Asunción
Paraguayan footballers
Paraguayan football managers
Paraguayan expatriate footballers
Paraguay international footballers
River Plate (Asunción) footballers
Club Rubio Ñu footballers
Club Sol de América footballers
Club Olimpia footballers
Hércules CF players
CD Málaga footballers
Hércules CF managers
Expatriate footballers in Spain
Paraguayan expatriate sportspeople in Spain
Association football goalkeepers